Hajdúnánás is a town in Hajdú-Bihar County, in the Northern Great Plain region of eastern Hungary.

Geography

Racetrack
On 21 June 2020, it was confirmed that Hungary will build a new modern, multifunctional and economically operable racetrack near Hajdúnánás, at the centre of the Debrecen-Miskolc-Nyíregyháza triangle, in the north-eastern part of the country.  This track would be suitable to host MotoGP, as well as Formula 1 races in the future.

Notable residents
 Zoltán Nagy, footballer
 József Mónus, world recorder archer
 Zoltán Csehi, footballer
 Annamária Bogdanović, handballer
 Ágnes Szilágyi, handballer
 Anita Kazai, handballer
 Valéria Szabó, handballer
 Tamás Kulcsár, footballer
 Anett Sopronyi, handballer
 R. Yisrael Efraim Fischel Schreiber (Sofer), Rabbi of Hajdúnánás and author the Afsei Aretz (1862)
 Gábor Tánczos, politician, Minister of Foreign Affairs (1919)
 Viktória Rédei Soós, handballer
 István Spitzmüller, footballer
 Paul Ornstein, Hungarian-American psychoanalyst
 Béla Vihar, poet, journalist, writer, teacher
 Meinhart Maur, German film actor
 Imre Hódos, wrestler
 Henrietta Csiszár, footballer

Twin towns – sister cities

Hajdúnánás is twinned with:
 Piešťany, Slovakia
 Ustroń, Poland
 Valea lui Mihai, Romania

References

External links

  in Hungarian

Populated places in Hajdú-Bihar County